Caracolus marginella is a species of air-breathing land snail, a terrestrial pulmonate gastropod mollusk in the family Pleurodontidae.

Distribution 
The distribution of Caracolus marginella includes:

 Puerto Rico
 Florida

Description 
The shell has 5-6 whorls. The width of the shell is 35–45 mm.

References

Further reading 
 Clapp G. H. (1919). "Cuban mollusks colonized in Florida". The Nautilus 32: 104-105.

External links
   Caracolus marginella on the UF / IFAS Featured Creatures Web site

Pleurodontidae
Gastropods described in 1791
Taxa named by Johann Friedrich Gmelin